Maulana Mohammadi Fayyaz was a Sufi saint. He was the successor of Muhibbullah Allahabadi.

He traveled to Allahabad to study. He went to Shaikh Muhibbullah Allahabadi weeping, because he was failing to learn. The Shaikh said that he would teach him. Shaikh taught him for a few hours, unsuccessfully. He became a saint in the company of Shaikh for fourteen years. After ceceiving Khirqa-e-Khilafat from Shah Muhibbullah he settled in Agra and devoted his life to prayer and mysticism. He was an authority on  the subjects of Fiqh, Tafsir, Usul and Kalam. He authored books and treatises, including a commentary on Taswiyah Shaikh"s most controversial treatise. His Silsilah (Sufistic order) is called Mohammadi Muhibbullahi and is spread over Arabia, Iran, Japan, and China.

Death

Fayyaz died on 28 January 1696 A.D having spent 19 days in fever. He died in Aurangabad while he was under house arrest for not ending his "bait" [swearing allegiance on hand]. His followers kept his body in a casket and transported it to Agra in three and half months. He was buried on 7 May 1696 in the cell Hujrah once inhabited.

Indian Sufi saints